Juan Edmunds Rapahango (1923 – August 20, 2012) was a Rapa Nui politician, the former Mayor of Hanga Roa, the municipality of Rapa Nui (Easter Island), in Chilean Polynesia. He is the son of Henry Percy Edmunds, director of the Williamson-Balfour Company, and Victoria Rapahango, an important native respondent for early ethnologists visiting the island. He is the father of the former mayor Pedro Pablo Edmunds Paoa. As mayor, Edmunds Rapahango promoted tourism to the island and helped to develop the island's infrastructure. He collaborated closely with William Mulloy and supported the American archaeologist's restoration projects. Edmunds Rapahango saw that Rapa Nui archaeology would play an important role the future of the island's economy.

References

External links
 William Mulloy Library
 Father Sebastian Englert Anthropology Museum
 Easter Island Foundation
 Rapa Nui Fact Sheet with Photographs
 Rapa Nui Photo Gallery
 The Statues and Rock Art of Rapa Nui

1923 births
2012 deaths
Rapanui politicians
Easter Island people
Hanga Roa
Mayors of places in Chile